Hard Labor Creek is a stream in the U.S. state of Georgia. It is a right-bank tributary of the Apalachee River.

According to tradition, the creek's name comes from the difficult task of the slaves who once tilled summer fields near its course.

See also 
 Hard Labor Creek State Park
 List of rivers of Georgia

References 

Rivers of Georgia (U.S. state)
Rivers of Greene County, Georgia
Rivers of Morgan County, Georgia
Rivers of Walton County, Georgia